Larsen House may refer to:

in Denmark
Carpenter Larsen's house, a historic house at Nymindegab Museum, in Varde Municipality

in the United States

Larsen Family House, Willits, California, NRHP-listed in Mendocino County
Larsen Fish Cabin at Captiva Rocks, Bokeelia, Florida, NRHP-listed
Archie Larsen House, Weiser, Idaho, NRHP-listed in Washington County
Chris Larsen House, Elk Horn, Iowa, NRHP-listed in Shelby County
Aage and Kristine Larsen Homestead, Dagmar, Montana, NRHP-listed in Montana
Erickson-Larsen Ensemble, Astoria, Oregon, NRHP-listed in Clatsop County
Smith-Larsen House, Centerville, Utah, NRHP-listed in Davis County
Oluf Larsen House, Ephraim, Utah, NRHP-listed in Sanpete County
Larsen-Noyes House, Ephraim, Utah, NRHP-listed in Sanpete County
Jens T. Larsen House, Kimballton, Iowa, NRHP-listed in Audubon County
Watkins-Tholman-Larsen Farmstead, Mt. Pleasant, Utah, NRHP-listed in Sanpete County
Christen Larsen House, Pleasant Grove, Utah, NRHP-listed in Utah County
Neils Peter Larsen House, Pleasant Grove, Utah, NRHP-listed in Utah County 
Erick Lehi and Ingrid Larsen Olson House, River Heights, Utah, NRHP-listed in Cache County